This list details events in the year 1838 in India. Major events include the Agra famine of 1837-38, and the founding of the Times of India on 3 November.

Incumbents
The Earl of Auckland, Governor-General, 1836–42.
Alexander Cunningham, aide-de-camp to Lord Auckland, 1836–1840
Sir John Keane, Lieutenant-General of the Bombay Army, 1834–1840
Zirat Prasad, regent of Bhaisunda, 1829–1840
Raghuji Bohonsle III, Maratha of Nagpur, 1818–1853
Gaya Prasad, Chaube of Taraon State, 1812–1840
Anand Rao Puar "Rao Sahib", Raja of Dewas State, 1817–1840
Dariao Singh, Rao of Paldeo, 1812–1840
Shiv Saran Singh, Rana of Baghal State, 1828-16 January 1840
Jashwant Singh, Raja of Nabha State, December 1783-21 May 1840
Kandhaji IV, Thakur Sahib of Palitana State, 1820–1840
Nonghanji IV, Thakur Sahib of Palitana State, 1824–1860
Henry Fane, Commander-in-Chief, India, 1835–1839
Chandrasinhji II Kesarisinhji, Maharana Raj Sahib of the Wankaner State, 1787–1839
Ranjit Singh, founder and Maharajah of the Sikh Empire, 1780–1839
Jashwant Singh, Rana of Alirajpur State, 1818-17 March 1862
Raja Zalim Sen, Raja of Mandi State, 1826–1839
Bhup Deo, Raja of Kanker State, 1818–1839

Events
First Anglo-Afghan War, 1837–1842
The Times of India is founded on 3 November
Jhalawar State is founded in the Hadoti region
Agra famine of 1837–38 kills 800,000 people in North-Western Provinces
Afghan Church founded in Mumbai
Basel Evangelical School is founded
Jessop & Company work on construction of the first iron bridge in British India, Loha-ka-Pul over River Gomti at Lucknow, 1812–1840

Law
Coasting Vessels Act

Births
Sultan Shah Jahan, Begum of Bhopal, Nawab of Bhopal, born on 29 July 1838
Jaswant Singh II, Maharaja of Jodhpur, born in Himatnagar
Gaurakisora Dasa Babaji, acharya from the Gaudiya Vaishnava tradition of Hinduism
Bankim Chandra Chattopadhyay, Bengali writer, poet and journalist, born on 27 June in Naihati, Bengal
Hormusjee Naorojee Mody, Parsi-Hongkonger businessman, born on 12 October 1838 in Bombay
William Ellison Boggs, chancellor of the University of Georgia, born in Ahmedunggar on 12 May 1838
Valentine Cameron Prinsep, British Pre-Raphaelite painter, born on 14 February 1838 in Calcutta
Colonel Charles Swinhoe, English naturalist and lepidopterist who served in the British Army in India, born on 27 August 1838 in Calcutta

Deaths
Mubarak Ali Khan II, Nawab of Bengal, died on 3 October
Shahaji I, ruler of Kolhapur State, on 29 November

References

 
India
Years of the 19th century in India